Vitaly Kyreiko (23 December 1926 - 19 October 2016) was a Ukrainian composer. 

He graduated from the Kyiv Conservatory with a degree in composition from L. Revutsky (1944-1949), where he also completed his postgraduate studies (1952). His other accomplishments include: 1949-88 - Lecturer, Associate Professor (1961), Professor (1978) of the Kyiv Conservatory, and Candidate of Art History (1953).

Selected works 
Operas:
The Forest Song, an adaptation of the play by Lesia Ukrainka (1957), 
On Sunday Morning She Gathered Herbs, an adaptation of the novelette by Olha Kobylianska (1966), 
Marko in Hell (1966)
The Boyar Woman (2003)
Ballets: 
Shadows of Forgotten Ancestors, an adaptation of the novella by Mykhailo Kotsiubynsky (1960), 
The Witch (1967), 
The Orgy (1977), based on the play by Lesia Ukrainka

Further reading

.

References

External links
Kyreiko, Vitalii, Internet encyclopedia of Ukraine
Kyreiko, Vitalii, encyclopedia of Ukrainian history [in Ukrainian]

Ukrainian composers
1926 births
2016 deaths